Razi Cov Pars is a COVID-19 vaccine developed by the Iranian Razi Vaccine and Serum Research Institute.

It's the second Iranian COVID-19 vaccine reaching human trials and is currently in phase III of clinical research during which it's compared to the Sinopharm BIBP vaccine. It received emergency use authorization in Iran on 31 October 2021.

Medical uses 
It requires three doses given day 0 (intramuscular), day 21 (intramuscular) and day 51 (intranasal spray).

Pharmacology 
Razi Cov Pars is a recombinant protein subunit vaccine containing the SARS-CoV-2 spike protein.

Manufacturing 
It's planned to produce one million doses of the vaccine each month as of September 2021.

As of 25 November 2021, 5 millions doses have been delivered to the Iranian Ministry of Health.

History

Clinical trials

Authorizations 
Raz Cov Pars received emergency use authorization in Iran on 31 October 2021.

See also 
 Pharmaceuticals in Iran
 COVID-19 pandemic in Iran
 COVID-19 vaccine clinical research

References 

Clinical trials
Science and technology in Iran
Protein subunit vaccines
Iranian COVID-19 vaccines